Petr Beneš (born 27 November 1974) is a Czech beach volleyball player. He played with Přemysl Kubala at the 2012 Summer Olympics.

References

1974 births
Living people
Czech men's volleyball players
Czech beach volleyball players
Olympic beach volleyball players of the Czech Republic
Beach volleyball players at the 2012 Summer Olympics
Men's beach volleyball players
Sportspeople from Prague